Daru is a surname. Notable people with the surname include:

 Phil Daru (born 1988), American former mixed martial artist and college football player
 Pierre Daru (1767–1829), French soldier, statesman, historian, and poet